Valerio Nawatu (born 24 July 1984) is a Fiji international footballer who is currently registered with Papakura City Football Club. He is currently the leading goal scorer in the Lotto NRFL Div 2 competition with 24 goals. He represents NZ Nadi in the Fijian competition in NZ.

External links

1984 births
Living people
Fijian footballers
Fiji international footballers
I-Taukei Fijian people
Nadi F.C. players
2008 OFC Nations Cup players
Association footballers not categorized by position